Metallibacterium is a Gram-negative genus of Pseudomonadota from the family of Rhodanobacteraceae with one known species (Metallibacterium scheffleri). Metallibacterium scheffleri has been isolated from acidic biofilm from a pyrite mine from the Harz Mountain in Germany.

References

Xanthomonadales
Bacteria genera
Monotypic bacteria genera